Longfield West is a civil parish in County Tyrone, Northern Ireland. It is situated in the historic barony of Omagh West.

Civil parish of Longfield West
The civil parish includes the villages of Dooish, Drumquin and Killen.

Townlands
The civil parish contains the following townlands:

Aghakinmart
Ally
Annaghalough
Barravey
Billary
Bomackatall Lower
Bomackatall Upper
Bullock Park
Carradoo Glebe
Carradowa Glebe
Carrick
Carrickaness
Carrickbwee Glebe
Castlecraig
Cavansallagh
Clunahill Glebe
Collow
Coolavannagh
Cornashesk
Curragh Glebe
Curraghamulkin
Curraghmacall
Dooish
Drumgallan
Drummenagh
Drumnamalra
Drumowen
Drumquin
Drumscra
Dunnaree
Ednashanlaght
Garrison Glebe
Gortnasoal Glebe
Hill Head
Killen
Killoan
Kilmore (Irvine)
Kilmore (Robinson)
Kirlish
Lackagh
Lisky Glebe
Marrock Glebe
Meenacloy
Meenadoan
Meenaheery Glebe
Meenbog
Meencargagh
Meenmossogue Glebe
Prughlish
Sloughan
Tully
Tullyard
Willmount

See also 
List of townlands in County Tyrone
List of civil parishes of County Tyrone

References